The Battle of Heilsberg took place on 10 June 1807, during the Napoleonic Wars.

Overview
On 24 May 1807, the Siege of Danzig ended when Prussian General Friedrich Adolf, Count von Kalckreuth capitulated to French Marshal François Joseph Lefebvre. This gave Napoleon the opportunity to engage the Russian forces led by Levin August von Bennigsen.  On 2 June, before Napoleon could act, Bennigsen ordered his columns to converge on Marshal Michel Ney's exposed VI Corps. Outnumbered by 63,000 to 17,000, Ney fought a rear guard action at the Battle of Guttstadt-Deppen on 5 and 6 June. Though he lost his baggage train, two guns, and 2,042 men, Ney managed to escape to the southwest over the Pasłęka (Passarge) River with the bulk of his soldiers.

Within two days, Napoleon had ordered his 190,000-man army to close in on the 100,000 Russians and 15,000 Prussians. Aware of their approach, Bennigsen ordered his troops to fall back on Lidzbark Warmiński ("Heilsberg" in German). The Russian army took up strong defensive positions around the town, which stood on the Łyna (Alle) River. The French army, under Marshals Murat and Lannes, attacked on 10 June. Bennigsen repelled several attacks, resulting in huge French casualties, but had to withdraw towards Friedland the following day. Four days later, the decisive Battle of Friedland occurred, ending the War of the Fourth Coalition with the passing of the Treaty of Tilsit.

Influences on the battle

Geography

The Battle of Heilsberg was fought on the Alle river, known today as the Lyna. The Teutonic Castle being the focal point of the battle was held by Russian control.

Terrain

Aside from geographical advantages, the Russians had also spent three to four months compiling tactics on how to defend against a French invasion, regardless of where they would attack the castlegrounds. Defensively, the castle was supported by its bridges and walls, both of which were built along the perimeter of the castle. The land surrounding the Teutonic Castle acted as an obstacle for the French army due to the increase of elevation from the base of the river to the castles foundation. The Prussian 21st Fusiliers, commanded by Ludwig August von Stutterheim, was garrisoned there.

Climate

Although the terrain was punishment enough for the French, weather also took a toll on their abilities and health. During the day, on top of the weight being carried in regards to supplies and armory, temperatures reached dangerously hot and humid levels. The dampness and bitter cold of the night also played a significant role by providing little opportunity for rest.

Progress of the battle

Tactics
Benningsen had been fooled into retreat by false reports of the French numbers. The Russians, having moved back to Heilsberg, had some protection from substantial fieldworks. In order to storm the fortifications, Napoleon had to choose between an immediate advance or a flanking movement, threatening the Russian supply base of Königsberg (now Kaliningrad). He chose the latter, and the French thus positioned themselves so as to cut off any opportunity for the Russians to obtain reinforcements.

The battle
The French cavalry under Joachim Murat was selected to lead the frontal attack, but Napoleon did not arrive on the field in person until Murat had already led a disastrous charge.  Marshal Mortier and Marshal Davout advanced on the Königsberg side. Soult and Lannes, leading separate cavalry units, and Ney, with the infantry, moved forwards on both sides of the River Łyna. These smaller units proved ineffective, especially when Prussian reinforcements arrived, sent by Anton Wilhelm von L'Estocq at Bennigsen's request. Lannes made an unsuccessful attack which cost the French 3,000 casualties. On the Russian side, Bennigsen was suffering from fever and had difficulty remaining in command. 

On 11 June, the substantial casualties on both sides and the success of the Russian defence gave Bennigsen and Napoleon little choice but to call an undocumented truce to end hostilities. The French had lost an estimated 12,000 men. The truce was focused primarily on the recovery of wounded soldiers.  The battle ended with medics and soldiers from both sides helping the wounded and retrieving the dead. When Napoleon entered the deserted Russian positions the following day, he found that all except the wounded had been evacuated overnight.

Outcome and post-war analysis
This battle is recognized as having been tactically inconclusive due to neither side having gained any significant ground, it is most notably discussed as a battle that yielded little change in the balance of strength between the Russians and the French. By most accounts, this was a successful Russo-Prussian rearguard action.  Napoleon never realized he faced the entire army at Heilsberg. Murat and Soult attacked prematurely and at the strongest point in the Russo-Prussian line.  The Russians had built extensive fortifications on the right bank of the Alle river, but only a few minor redoubts on the left bank, yet the French advanced over the river to give battle, squandering their advantages and incurring casualties 
The Battle of Heilsberg was fought four days before the decisive Battle of Friedland.

French Army losses
1,398 killed, 10,059 wounded, 864 captured  Three units lost their eagles, and Digby Smith places the losses higher than Clodfelter, at 1,398 killed, 10,059 wounded and 864 captured. 
Nicolas Jean-de-Dieu Soult's IV corps sustained the majority of losses: 8,286, and General François Xavier Roussel, Chief of Staff of the Imperial Guard, was killed.  Three generals were wounded, and Jean Lannes' corps lost 2,284 killed and wounded.

Russo-Prussian losses
Disputes over the killed and wounded remain.  Clodfelter estimates 6,000 killed and wounded.  In addition, generals Koschin, Warneck, and Pahlen were killed; Dmitry Dokhturov, Werdrevski, Fock, Zakhar Dmitrievich Olsufiev, Duka, Laptiev, Passeck and Duke Charles of Mecklenburg were wounded. The Russian commander, Bennigsen was sick all day, but remained on his horse despite falling off unconscious several times. Digby Smith says that the Russian Prussian force lost 2-3000 dead, and about 5-6000 wounded, and they lost two guns.

Notable officers of the French Army present were:
Commandant in chief : Napoléon Bonaparte
Marshall Louis-Alexandre Berthier, prince de Neuchatel
Marshall Joachim Murat
Marshall Nicolas Jean-de-Dieu Soult
Marshall Jean Lannes
Major General Nicolas Charles Oudinot
Major General Jean-Antoine Verdier
 Colonel François-Joseph d'Offenstein (made Brigadier general further to this battle)

Notable officers of the Russian Army present were:
Commandant in chief : Bennigsen was sick, but remained in command
Marshall Matvei Platov
Marshall Prince Gorchakov
Marshall Dmitry Dokhturov (wounded)
Marshall Prince Bagration
Major General Fabian Steinheil

References

Works cited

External links
 Spring Campaign 1807. Heilsberg — one of the bloodiest battles of the Napoleonic Wars
 Battle of Heilsberg
 Battlefield Anomalies: The battle of Heilsberg
 French and Russian Order Of Battle of Heilsberg
 Heilsberg and the battle 
 La bataille de Heilsberg 
 2007 г. Lidzbark Warminski—первая реконструкция сражения посвященная 200 летию.
 Napoleans Campaign in Poland
 Map Database of Heilsberg

Conflicts in 1807
Battles of the Napoleonic Wars
Battles of the War of the Fourth Coalition
Battles involving Russia
Battles involving France
History of Warmian-Masurian Voivodeship
East Prussia
1807 in France
1807 in Germany
1807 in Prussia
June 1807 events
Battles inscribed on the Arc de Triomphe
Joachim Murat